Società Sportiva Calcio Napoli contested the Serie A, the UEFA Champions League (for the first time) and won the 2011–12 Coppa Italia during the 2011–12 season.

Players

Squad information

Competitions

Serie A

League table

Results summary

Results by round

Matches

Coppa Italia

UEFA Champions League

Group stage

Knockout phase

Round of 16

Statistics

Goalscorers

References

S.S.C. Napoli seasons
Napoli
Napoli